Koovathur (South) is a village in the Andimadam taluk of Ariyalur district, Tamil Nadu, India.

Demographics 

As per the 2001 census, Koovathur (South) had a total population of 3909 with 1947 males and 1962 females.

See also
Koovathur (North)

References 

Villages in Ariyalur district